The Scotland Under-19 cricket team represents the nation of Scotland in Under-19 cricket at international level.

Scotland has qualified for the Under-19 Cricket World Cup on eight occasions, the third-most of European countries behind England and Ireland. Scotland has never progressed past the first round, with their best performance coming in 2012 when they won the 11th-place play-off against Ireland.

Under-19 World Cup record

Records
All records listed are for under-19 One Day International (ODI) matches only.

Team records

Highest totals
 250/3 (50 overs), v. , at Witrand Cricket Field, Potchefstroom, 28 January 2020
 244/9 (50 overs), v. , at Avion Park Cricket Club, Kempton Park, 19 January 1998
 241/7 (50 overs), v. , at Peter Burge Oval, Brisbane, 19 August 2012
 236/8 (50 overs), v. , at Conaree Sports Club, Basseterre, 19 January 2022
 234/4 (50 overs), v. , at Eden Park Outer Oval, Auckland, 28 January 2002

Lowest totals
 22 (22.3 overs), v. , at M. A. Aziz Stadium, Chittagong, 22 February 2004
 75 (23.5 overs), v. , at North-West University No. 1 Ground, Potchefstroom, 19 January 2020
 88 (29.4 overs), v. , at Dubai International Cricket Stadium, Dubai, 17 February 2014
 89 (30.3 overs), v. , at Witrand Cricket Field, Potchefstroom, 21 January 2020
 95 (30.2 overs), v. , at Khan Shaheb Osman Ali Stadium, Fatullah, 17 February 2004
 95 (35.1 overs), v. , at Warner Park Sporting Complex, Basseterre, 17 January 2022

Individual records

Most career runs
 306 – Ross McLean (2012-2014)
 300 – Kyle Coetzer (2002-2004)
 288 – Moneeb Iqbal (2002-2006)
 270 – Kasiam Farid (2004-2006)
 240 – Greig Butchart (1998)

Highest individual scores
 128* (? balls) – Greig Butchart, v. , at Avion Park Cricket Club, Kempton Park, 19 January 1998
 100* (102 balls) – Steven Gilmour, v. , at Eden Park Outer Oval, Auckland, 28 January 2002
 76 (89 balls) – Kasiam Farid, v. , at R. Premadasa Stadium, Colombo, 5 February 2006
 72 (? balls) – Neil Millar, v. , at Avion Park Cricket Club, Kempton Park, 20 January 1998
 72 (123 balls) – Michael English, v. , at Tolerance Oval, Abu Dhabi, 24 February 2014

Most career wickets
 19 – Moneeb Iqbal (2002-2006)
 15 – Gavin Main (2012-2014)
 13 – Gordon Goudie (2004-2006)
 12 – Ruaidhri Smith (2012)
 9 – Gregor Maiden (1998), Chris West (2002), Aman Bailwal (2012), Chayank Gosain (2014), Sean Fischer-Keogh (2022), Charlie Peet (2022)

Best bowling performances
 6/24 (6.4 overs) – Jamie Cairns, v. , at Diego Martin Sporting Complex, Diego Martin, 30 January 2022
 4/26 (8 overs) – Gavin Main, v. , at John Blanck Oval, Buderim, 15 August 2012
 4/32 (7 overs) – Daniel Cairns, v. , at Witrand Cricket Field, Potchefstroom, 28 January 2020
 4/45 (10 overs) – Ruaidhri Smith, v. , at John Blanck Oval, Buderim, 15 August 2012
 4/60 (10 overs) – Mohammad Ghaffar, v. , at Sheikh Kamal International Stadium, Cox's Bazar, 31 January 2016

Squad
The 2020 Under 19 squad to South Africa was captained by Angus Guy and vice captain Jasper Davidson.
They finished 12th recording one win v UAE

The Under-19 team for Scotland for 2016 Under-19 Cricket World Cup. Scotland's squad was announced on 22 December 2015. Scott Cameron was originally named in the squad, but was replaced by Cameron Sloman after injuring his back prior to the tournament.

 Note: bowling information on all Scottish players is not yet available.

Coaching team 
 Head coach: Gordon Drummond 
 Assistant coach: Cedric English
 Manager: Ron Fleming
 S&C Coach: Neil Elbourne
 Mental Skills Coach: Ali Storie

References

External links
Cricket Scotland Website
U-19's Squad

Under-19 cricket teams
U-19
Cricket, U-19